Donald Sinclair (January 9, 1899 – October 5, 1978) was an American farmer and politician.

Sinclair was born on a farm in Stephen, Marshall County, Minnesota and graduated from Stephen High School. He served in the United States Navy during World War I and then received his bachelor's degree from University of Minnesota in 1924. Sinclair lived in Stephen, Minnesota with his wife and family and was a farmer. Sinclair served in the Minnesota Senate from 1947 until 1972 and was a Democrat. Ne died from cancer in a hospital in Warren, Minnesota.

References

1899 births
1978 deaths
People from Marshall County, Minnesota
Military personnel from Minnesota
University of Minnesota alumni
Farmers from Minnesota
Democratic Party Minnesota state senators
Deaths from cancer in Minnesota